Derek Abrefa is a Ghanaian born table tennis player. He started playing table tennis when he was in Presbyterian Senior High School, Osu as a student and junior national champion. Derek being a junior ping pong player represented Ghana at the Africa Junior Championship in Alexandria, Egypt and the All African Games in Algiers, Algeria in 2007.

Abrefa is a two-time bronze medallist at the All Africa Games and Commonwealth and currently ranked number 1 in Ghana by the Ghana Table Tennis Federation. He is currently ranked 278 in the world by the International Table Tennis Federation (ITTF).

Career
Abrefa started off as a junior ping pong player in the Africa Junior Championship in Alexandria, Egypt and the All African Games in Algiers, Algeria in 2007.

In 2008 he won gold and silver medals in the African Championship in Cote d'Ivoire. He was part of the team representing Ghana at the 2018 Commonwealth Games in Gold Coast, Australia. During the commonwealth games in Gold Coast, Australia Derek has made the men's single match where he beat Sierra Leone's Emmanuel Gboyah in four straight sets, (11-5, 11–1, 11–4, 11–5).

He also represented Ghana at the 2019 African Games and he was the flag bearer at the opening ceremony.

More recently Abrefa won the GTTA Grandmaster Championship Men's Singles, which consisted of the Top 10 players in Ghana. He defeated Felix Lartey in the Finals.

Career Records

He came first place in the January Westchester Open in the U2500 rating. He also won bronze medals for Ghana at the All African Games in Brazzaville Congo in 2015.

References 

Living people
Commonwealth Games competitors for Ghana
Ghana at the Commonwealth Games
Table tennis players at the 2018 Commonwealth Games
Year of birth missing (living people)
Competitors at the 2019 African Games
Ghanaian male table tennis players
African Games competitors for Ghana